Richard James Hall ,(born 23 August 1984) is a former motorcycle speedway rider from England.

Career
Born in Northallerton, North Yorkshire, Hall began his career with the Newcastle Diamonds, making his debut in the Premier League in 2001, before making his Conference League debut in 2002. Hall rode in the Premier League for Newcastle in 2002, recording an average of 1.52, but managed an average of 7.49 in the Conference League with the Newcastle Gems. Hall spent 2003 without a Premier League ride but he was ever present for Sheffield Tigers in the Conference League, averaging 8.46 a meeting. He also rode five matches for the Boston Barracudas in the Conference Trophy, and eight matches for the Coventry Bees in the British League Cup.

His good form saw him earn a place in the Sheffield Tigers team for 2004, where he averaged 5.55 from 47 meetings. He averaged over five once again in 2005 but in a surprise move he was signed by the Peterborough Panthers for 2006 to ride in the Elite League. In 2006, Hall recorded a 4.54 average and the Panthers won the Elite League Championship with Hall playing a vital role in the second leg of the play-off final. He returned to the Panthers in 2007 but his season was cut short after receiving a fractured pelvis and broken ankle in the Garry Stead Benefit Meeting at Sheffield, a few days after being dropped by the Panthers.

Hall moved from the Elite League team Peterborough Panthers at the end of the 2007 season to captain the Scunthorpe Scorpions in their first season in the Premier League in 2008.  In 2008, Hall rode for the Scunthorpe Scorpions in the Premier League. He signed for Sheffield for the 2009 season. In 2011 he joined Leicester Lions as team captain, although he was released mid-season, rejoining Scunthorpe Scorpions. In 2012 he signed for the Sheffield Tigers. In 2014, Hall started the season with Redcar but received a 30-day ban for kicking Scunthorpe's Josh Auty, and was replaced by Poland's Rafal Konopka. Hall sat out of British speedway until a brief, unsuccessful spell with the Peterborough Panthers later that year.

In 2015, Hall was part of the British team with Andrew Appleton, Glen Phillips and James Shanes that won the world championship gold medal at the 2015 Team Long Track World Championship. It was the first time that Britain had won the event.

World Longtrack Championship

Grand-Prix Years

2004 - 3pts, 25th Overall (1 gp app)
2009 - 39pts, 12th Overall (5 gp app)
2011 - 50pts, 14th Overall (6 gp app)
2013 - 96pts, 3rd Overall (6 gp app)
2014 - 65pts, 4th Overall (4 gp app) 
2015 - 44pts, 8th Overall (4 gp app) 
2016 - 61pts, 6th Overall (5gp app)

Best Grand-Prix Results
First
 Marmande 2013 (1st)
 Morizes 2014 (1st)
 Vetcha 2015 (2nd)

Challenge Best
2008  Aduard (3rd)
 2010  Forssa (3rd)

World Longtrack Team Championship

 2008 -  Werlte (with Glen Phillips, Mitch Godden & Vincent Kinchin ) bronze medal
 2009 -   Eenrum (with Paul Hurry, Glen Phillips & Andrew Appleton) Fourth
 2010 -   Morizes (with Glen Phillips, Andrew Appleton & Chris Mills) Fourth
 2013 -   Folkestone (with Andrew Appleton, Glen Phillips & Paul Cooper) Third
 2014 -   Forssa (with Glen Phillips, Andrew Appleton & David Howe) Fifth
 2015 -   Muhldorf (with Glen Phillips, Andrew Appleton & James Shanes) Champions
 2016 -   Mariánské Lázně (with Glen Phillips, Andrew Appleton & James Shanes) 4th
 2017 -   Roden (with Edward Kennett, Andrew Appleton & James Shanes) 6th

European Grasstrack Championship

2009  Berghaupten 5th (12pts)
2011  Skegness 9th (15pts)
2012  Eenrum 10th (12pts)

Other Honours
 British Junior Sand Racing Champion,
 British Intermediate Sand Racing Champion – 2 times holder
 ACU National Grasstrack Challenge Champion

References

1984 births
Living people
British speedway riders
English motorcycle racers
Leicester Lions riders
Peterborough Panthers riders
Sheffield Tigers riders
Scunthorpe Scorpions riders
Redcar Bears riders
Individual Speedway Long Track World Championship riders